Abdelkader Bedrane (born 2 April 1992) is an Algerian footballer who plays as a defender for Saudi Professional League club Damac and the Algeria national team.

Career statistics

Club

Honours
ES Setif
Algerian Ligue Professionnelle 1: 2016–17
Algerian Super Cup: 2017

Espérance de Tunis
Tunisian Ligue Professionnelle 1: 2019–20, 2020–21, 2021–22
Tunisian Super Cup: 2020, 2020–21

Algeria
FIFA Arab Cup: 2021

References

External links

1992 births
Living people
Association football defenders
Algerian Ligue Professionnelle 1 players
Tunisian Ligue Professionnelle 1 players
Saudi Professional League players
Algerian footballers
People from Blida
USM Blida players
ES Sétif players
Espérance Sportive de Tunis players
Damac FC players
21st-century Algerian people
2021 Africa Cup of Nations players
Algerian expatriate footballers
Algerian expatriate sportspeople in Saudi Arabia
Expatriate footballers in Saudi Arabia